Lucien Botovasoa (1908 – 14 April 1947) was a Madagascan Roman Catholic schoolteacher and a professed member from the Secular Franciscan Order. Botovasoa served as a teacher for his entire life and was dedicated to both the religious and secular education of children. His thirst for the religious life led him to discover the Secular Franciscan Order in 1940 and he became part of it; he rallied others to know Francis of Assisi and enter the order themselves. Botovasoa likewise adopted the Franciscan charism for himself through his fasting and clothing habits.

Botovasoa's murder came during a period of tumult in Madagascar and his cause for canonization opened on 11 October 2011 under Pope Benedict XVI in which he became titled as a Servant of God. Pope Francis confirmed in mid-2017 that Botovasoa was killed in hatred of his faith and decreed that he was to be beatified; it was celebrated in Vohipeno on 15 April 2018.

Life
Lucien Botovasoa was born sometime in 1908 in Madagascar as the first of nine brothers and sisters. One brother was André.

Botovasoa studied first in a public school from 1918 before being baptized and receiving his First Communion in 1922,. He later completed his studies from 1922 until 1928 at the Jesuit college of Saint Joseph before becoming an instructor there with his new teaching diploma. He made it a practice after each lesson to read about the lives of the saints to those students who wanted to hear about them and he often added his own comments and words of encouragement to the students.

On 10 October 1930 he married Suzanna Soazana (b. 1914) in his local parish and the pair had five children; his wife was pregnant with their final child at the time of Lucien's murder. His firstborn Vincent de Paul Hermann was born on 12 September 1931. One nun once said to him that he'd made a fine priest and asked him if he had ever regretted marriage. But Botovasoa replied without hesitation: "I do not have the slightest regret at all" and further added it allowed him to serve God through that particular vocation. Botovasoa was among the first to enter the Crusaders of the Heart of Jesus when it settled in his hometown of Vohipeno and was received on 18 August 1935 before becoming its treasurer in 1936 which was a position he held until his death. In addition to his native tongue he had mastered the Chinese language as well as German and French. He was an exceptional singer and musician and even served as the director of the parish choir. He was also described as an athletic singer who never ceased smiling.

But he desired to become a religious though was well aware of the fact that he could not become a religious while still married. He had no desire to leave his wife and children but instead become a secular religious so sought out books looking for saints who were married to no avail. But providence in 1940 led him to discover a handbook regarding the Secular Franciscan Order which appealed to him at once. But secular orders were nil in Madagascar and so he sought out people to join him in establishing a branch of the order in the region. He rallied one local woman and other companions to set up one such branch. Botovasoa was invested in the habit and the order on 18 December 1944. His wife feared that he would abandon her to become a religious but he burst out laughing instead and assured her that it was farthest from the truth. Botovasoa often fasted and dressed in plain beige trousers and a khaki shirt for he stressed that "it's the color of the clothes that tertiaries wear". His wife reproached him for not wearing black trousers as was traditional for teachers though he continued to tell her that this was insignificant in the face of his religious practices.

Into the New Year in 1947 the general trust of the population saw a political organization want to present him as a candidate in its election but he refused this for he deemed politics to be a strange and different realm for him that he did not want to associate himself with. But there soon became great unrest in the region in which priests and nuns were being rounded up before a full uprising broke out. He accepted his father's invitation to return to his old hometown on 30 March 1947 but returned home on 9 April after hearing of massacres near his home where he also learned of the rounding up of the religious. Botovasoa was well aware that he could be captured and killed due to his status as a religious educator but did not fear what would happen to him.

On 14 April he was at home having lunch with his wife and children when a pious woman came and told him of rumors that a teacher was to be summoned before the chief which prompted his wife to weep since she knew that it would be her husband. Botovasoa remained unmoved at this news and spoke with his wife after lunch of what might happen to him and gave her last instructions for the care of their children and their unborn child. Four men knocked on his door at 9:00pm requesting he go with them to see the chief who wished to judge him. He went with them and offered himself to them for death without complaints before being invited to sit and speak with the chief for half an hour before being led off. The chief pronounced the death sentence at 10:00pm and Botovasoa was led off to be executed.

Botovasoa was to be killed at the edge of the Matitanana river and en route asked to stop and reflect. He knelt for sometime in deep reflection before continuing along the path. Upon their arrival his captors wanted to tie his hands together though he offered to do that himself in the form of a cross. He knelt at the edge of the water in contemplation noting that the executioners were men that he himself had taught at school as students at some stage. The chief executioner beheaded Botovasoa with his sword and the others took turns striking a blow or wetting the sword in his blood before tossing his remains into the waters. Botovasoa died in his beige khaki jacket and trousers with a black cord for a belt.

Beatification
The beatification process opened under Pope Benedict XVI on 11 October 2011 after the Congregation for the Causes of Saints issued the official "nihil obstat" (nothing against) to the cause and titled him as a Servant of God. The diocesan process of investigation opened in Farafangana on 7 September 2011 and was concluded there on 17 April 2013. The C.C.S. validated this process in Rome on 21 March 2014 before receiving the Positio in 2015 for investigation. Historians approved this dossier on 4 September 2015 as did the theologians on 8 November 2016 and the C.C.S. themselves on 2 May 2017.

Pope Francis approved the fact that Botovasoa was killed in hatred of his faith on 4 May 2017 and decreed that the late Franciscan was to be beatified which shall occur on 15 April 2018. Reports indicated that Botovasoa could be beatified that November but the national episcopal conference of Madagascar announced on 15 November that Botovasoa would be beatified on 15 April 2018; Cardinal Angelo Amato was to preside over the beatification in Vohipeno but Air France strikes prevented his presence. The cardinal's absence from the celebration enabled the Mauritian cardinal Maurice Piat to preside over the beatification on the pope's behalf in light of Amato not being able to preside himself.

The current postulator for this cause is Carlo Calloni.

References

External links
 Hagiography Circle

1908 births
1947 deaths
20th-century Malagasy educators
20th-century venerated Christians
Assassinated Malagasy people
Beatifications by Pope Francis
Deaths by decapitation
Franciscan beatified people
Malagasy murder victims
Malagasy Roman Catholics
People executed by decapitation
People from Vatovavy-Fitovinany
Secular Franciscans
Venerated Catholics